The Sri Venkateswara University College of Engineering (abbreviated SVUCE), Tirupati is a Constituent and Autonomous College of  Sri Venkateswara University, Tirupati, Andhra Pradesh, India -517502 . It is located in the Sri Venkateswara University campus at the foothills of Lord Sri Venkateswara Swamy in Tirupati, India. The college offers 4-year B.Tech degree Programme with a total intake of 396  students in six Engineering Departments, two-year M.Tech Degree Programme with Nine Specialization's with an intake of  180 students and Ph.D. programmes in all Engineering Departments.

The admission into undergraduate programmes is through a state level common entrance test EAMCET. The admission into postgraduate programme is 70% of students through GATE or AP PGECET and 30% of Students through Self-finance Management Category .

The college has well-equipped laboratories in all disciplines, improved and modernized through different schemes like MODROBS, TEQIP etc. The faculty is well qualified, most of them being Ph.D. degree holders and actively engaged in teaching, research and consultancy testing services, besides disseminating knowledge by conducting Workshops, Seminars, Conferences, and Symposia.

History
SVUCE, a constituent and Autonomous College of Sri Venkateswara University, Tirupati, was established in 1959 and started functioning from 10 August 1959.

The foundation stone for the college Main Building was laid on 13 October 1959 by Pandit Jawaharlal Nehru, the first Prime Minister of India. It was declared open on 21 November 1968 by Sri. K Brahmananda Reddy, the then Chief Minister of Andhra Pradesh.

From the year 1977-78, the names of BE and ME were changed as B.Tech and M.Tech. The institution achieved autonomous status in 2005.

SVU Secured 63rd Rank out of 100 Ranks, out of about 850 Central, State, Deemed, Private Universities, Central Institutions in India. S.V.University stands 13th position in Research Component.

Sri Venkateswara University, Tirupati also stands 186th Rank in the BRICS World Ranking – 2016.

Disciplines
Currently the college offers B.Tech courses in:
 Chemical Engineering (from 1977–78)
 Civil Engineering (from 1959–60)
 Electrical and Electronics Engineering (from 1959–60)
 Electronics and Communication Engineering (from 1971–72)
 Mechanical Engineering (from 1959–60)
 Computer Science and Engineering (from 1986–87)

At first three conventional disciplines of Civil, Electrical and Mechanical Engineering were offered with an intake of 40 in each as part of Bachelor of Engineering (B.E) degree. Subsequently, new disciplines were introduced in tune with the emerging trends and needs - Electronics and Communication Engineering in 1971-72, Chemical Engineering in 1977-78 and Computer Science and Engineering in 1986-87.

Part-time degree course for diploma holders and serving engineers was run for a number of years from 1973-74 until recently in three conventional disciplines of Civil, Mechanical, Electrical and Electronics, Electronics and Communications.

Postgraduate courses (ME) in engineering branches were started in the year 1971-72 in Departments of Civil Engineering, Electrical and Electronics Engineering, Electronics and Communication Engineering. Subsequently, PG courses were introduced in Chemical Engineering and Computer Science and Engineering.

Each discipline admits a maximum of 60 students in the bachelor's stream and a maximum of 24 students in each of the postgraduate specializations per academic year.

Extracurricular activities
 NCC - Air Wing
 NSS

Principals

Alumni Association
The college alumni has presence all over the globe. The alumni association of SVUCE was started in 1965. It was formally registered in the year 2001. The association is currently presided by B. Gangi Reddy.

There are hundreds of SVUCE alumni based in western countries such as the UK, Canada, Australia, and UK. This powerful alumni network has led to job opportunities for many graduates.

References

External links
 Alumni of SVUCE
 Sri venkateswara University
 SVUCE website
 http://svuce.edu.in/Pages/About/History.aspx

Engineering colleges in Andhra Pradesh
Universities and colleges in Tirupati
Universities in Andhra Pradesh
Educational institutions established in 1959
1959 establishments in Andhra Pradesh
Sri Venkateswara University